Cradle is a 2015 science-fiction first-person adventure game on the topic of transhumanism, developed by Flying Cafe for Semianimals.

Reception 
The game was reviewed by various critics.

References

External links 
 

2015 video games
Adventure games
Linux games
Post-apocalyptic video games
Transhumanism in video games
Video games about viral outbreaks
Video games developed in Ukraine
Windows games